Lomo a lo pobre, bistec a lo pobre  or bife a lo pobre is a dish from Peru and Chile. The ingredients are beef tenderloin (Spanish lomo) topped with one or more fried eggs and French fries. Unlike steak and eggs, lomo a lo pobre is eaten as a lunch or dinner.

Etymology in Perú
There are several possible origins for the term "a lo pobre."

One is that it was named because of the irony of nineteenth-century Peruvian common folk eating similar dishes with an abundance of food and at a heavy price, despite their economic situation.

Alternatively, it may have originated due to the idea that poorer residents of Lima ate meat combined with carbohydrates, eggs, and rice, while higher-class individuals were associated with eating meat alone with a vegetable. Yet another possibility is that it is a derivation from "au Poivre" even though the preparations are quite different.

Today it is consumed in lower- and upper-class restaurants, and there is no negative connotation associated with the dish.

The term "a lo pobre" in Lima, Peru today may refer simply to the addition of a fried egg and is used in other dishes besides steak, such as grilled chicken breast (pechuga a lo pobre), rice (especially arroz chaufa), lomo saltado, salchipapas, or even hamburgers.

See also
 Bife a cavalo
 Steak and eggs
 List of beef dishes

References

Chilean cuisine
Peruvian cuisine
Egg dishes
Beef dishes